Uraeotyphlus gansi, the Gansi caecilian, is a rare species of caecilian, endemic to the Western Ghats of India. It was discovered in the Kaakkaachi-Naalumukku area of the Kalakkad Mundanthurai Tiger Reserve. U. gansi was named after Carl Gans (1923–2009), a renowned herpetologist from Texas.

According to Albert Rajendran, Research Department of Zoology, St. John's College, Palayamkottai, Rajendran spotted the species, along with his collaborator David J. Gower of the Natural History Museum, London, and two other experts in caecilians. He came across this limbless amphibian in the Kaakkaachi-Naalumukku areas  during his study of the burrowing uropeltid (shield-tailed) snakes of the Western Ghats.

References 

gansi
Taxa named by David J. Gower
Amphibians described in 2008
Amphibians of India
Endemic fauna of the Western Ghats